The 1979 Giro d'Italia was the 62nd edition of the Giro d'Italia, one of cycling's Grand Tours. The Giro began with a prologue individual time trial in Florence on 17 May, and Stage 9 occurred on 26 May with a mountainous stage to Pistoia. The race finished in Milan on 6 June.

Prologue
17 May 1979 — Florence to Florence,  (ITT)

Stage 1
18 May 1979 — Florence to Perugia,

Stage 2
19 May 1979 — Perugia to Castel Gandolfo,

Stage 3
20 May 1979 — Caserta to Naples,  (ITT)

Stage 4
21 May 1979 — Caserta to Potenza,

Stage 5
22 May 1979 — Potenza to Vieste,

Stage 6
23 May 1979 — Vieste to Chieti,

Stage 7
24 May 1979 — Chieti to Pesaro,

Stage 8
25 May 1979 — Rimini to San Marino,  (ITT)

Stage 9
26 May 1979 — San Marino to Pistoia,

References

1979 Giro d'Italia
Giro d'Italia stages